"Speak the speech" is a famous speech from Shakespeare's Hamlet (1601). In it, Hamlet offers directions and advice to a group of actors whom he has enlisted to play for the court of Denmark.

The speech itself has played two important roles independent of the play. It has been analyzed as a historical document for clues about the nature of early modern acting practices and it has also been used as a contemporary guide to the performance of Shakespearean drama.

While there is some justification for each of these approaches, they should be distinguished from other, far less valid assertions: on the one hand, that Hamlet expresses the opinions of Shakespeare on the art of acting in a straightforward and unproblematic way; on the other, that the speech offers a proto-Stanislavskian view of the art of acting. The first elides the difference between author and character, while the second ignores the historical specificity of the discourses and meanings attached to theatrical performance.

Notes

Works cited

 Edwards, Philip, ed. 1985. Hamlet, Prince of Denmark by William Shakespeare. The New Cambridge Shakespeare Ser. Cambridge: Cambridge University Press. .
 Hall, Peter. 2004. Shakespeare's Advice to the Players. London: Oberon. .
 Innes, Christopher D. 2000. A sourcebook on naturalist theatre. London: Routledge. .
 Merlin, Bella. 2007. The Complete Stanislavsky Toolkit. London: Nick Hern. .
 Rodenberg, Patsy. 2002. Speaking Shakespeare. London: Methuen. .
 Roach, Joseph R. 1985. The Player's Passion: Studies in the Science of Acting. Theater:Theory/Text/Performance Ser. Ann Arbor: University of Michigan Press. .

Further reading

 Berry, Cicely. 2000. The Actor and the Text. Rev. ed. London: Virgin Books. .
 Carlson, Marvin. 1993. Theories of the Theatre: A Historical and Critical Survey from the Greeks to the Present. Expanded ed. Ithaca and London: Cornell University Press. .midhun
 Hagen, Uta. 1973. Respect for Acting. New York: Macmillan. .
 Rayner, Alice. 1994. To Act, To Do, To Perform: Drama and the Phenomenology of Action. Theater: Theory/Text/Performance Ser. Ann Arbor: University of Michigan Press. .
 Weimann, Robert. 1978. Shakespeare and the Popular Tradition in the Theater: Studies in the Social Dimension of Dramatic Form and Function. Baltimore and London: The Johns Hopkins University Press. .

Hamlet
Acting
Monologues
History of theatre